Metro Channel (formerly Lifestyle (Network), visually rendered in its logo in all capital letters as METRO CHANNEL) is a Philippine pay television channel based in Quezon City. It is owned by Creative Programs Inc., a subsidiary of media conglomerate ABS-CBN Corporation. Its programming is composed primarily of lifestyle and entertainment shows targeted to upscale women. 
The channel was officially launched on April 2, 2018, and it was named after Metro Magazine, one of the leading lifestyle magazines in the country published by ABS-CBN Publishing. The channel became available on G Sat Channel 70 on October 5, 2020 and on January 4, 2021, on Cignal Channel 69 replacing the channel space of Disney XD Asia. A video on demand service for Metro Channel shows are available via IWantTFC.

Programming blocks
 Home & Living on Metro Channel - focused on home improvements, room makeovers, interior design and modern living.
 Food & Travel on Metro Channel - focused on food, travel and adventure.
 Fashion & Style on Metro Channel focused on fashion and style.
 Entertainment & Glamour on Metro Channel focused on the best entertainment and glamour.

Programming

Original programming, special features and segments
 At The Table (Season 2) (formerly Chasing Flavors; 2017–present)
 Beached (2018–present)
 Casa Zobel De Ayala (Season 2) (2017–present)
 Driven (2018–present)
 In The Metro (2018–present)
 Metro Best K-Drama Awards (2020–present)
 Pia's Postcards (2018–present)

See also
TAP TV
ETC (defunct)
Colours (defunct)
SolarFlix

References

External links 
 

Television networks in the Philippines
Television channels and stations established in 2018
English-language television stations in the Philippines
Women's interest channels
Creative Programs
Assets owned by ABS-CBN Corporation
ABS-CBN Corporation channels